A marginal likelihood is a likelihood function that has been integrated over the parameter space. In Bayesian statistics, it represents the probability of generating the observed sample from a prior and is therefore often referred to as model evidence or simply evidence.

Concept

The marginal likelihood quantifies the agreement between data and prior in a geometric sense made precise in de Carvalho et al. (2019).

Unfortunately, marginal likelihoods are generally difficult to compute. Exact solutions are known for a small class of distributions, particularly when the marginalized-out parameter is the conjugate prior of the distribution of the data. In other cases, some kind of numerical integration method is needed, either a general method such as Gaussian integration or a Monte Carlo method, or a method specialized to statistical problems such as the Laplace approximation, Gibbs/Metropolis sampling, or the EM algorithm.

It is also possible to apply the above considerations to a single random variable (data point) , rather than a set of observations.  In a Bayesian context, this is equivalent to the prior predictive distribution of a data point.

Applications

Bayesian model comparison 
In Bayesian model comparison, the marginalized variables  are parameters for a particular type of model, and the remaining variable  is the identity of the model itself. In this case, the marginalized likelihood is the probability of the data given the model type, not assuming any particular model parameters. Writing  for the model parameters, the marginal likelihood for the model M is

It is in this context that the term model evidence is normally used.  This quantity is important because the posterior odds ratio for a model M1 against another model M2 involves a ratio of marginal likelihoods, the so-called Bayes factor:

which can be stated schematically as

posterior odds = prior odds × Bayes factor

See also
 Empirical Bayes methods
 Lindley's paradox
 Marginal probability
 Bayesian information criterion

References 

 Charles S. Bos. "A comparison of marginal likelihood computation methods". In W. Härdle and B. Ronz, editors, COMPSTAT 2002: Proceedings in Computational Statistics, pp. 111–117. 2002. (Available as a preprint on the web)
 de Carvalho, Miguel; Page, Garritt; Barney, Bradley (2019). "On the geometry of Bayesian inference". Bayesian Analysis. 14 (4): 1013‒1036. (Available as a preprint on the web)
 
 The on-line textbook: Information Theory, Inference, and Learning Algorithms, by David J.C. MacKay.

Bayesian statistics